The following lists events in the year 2017 in Armenia.

Incumbents
 President: Serzh Sargsyan
 Prime Minister: Karen Karapetyan
 Speaker: Galust Sahakyan (until 18 May), Ara Babloyan (from 18 May)

Events

February
 27 February - The EU and Armenia have agreed to a new pact tightening political ties 3 years after rejection by Armenia.

April
 2 April - Voters go to the polls to vote in the parliamentary election, which is alleged to be tainted by vote-buying.
 3 April – Karen Karapetyan and the Republicans win the 2017 parliamentary election.

August
 31 August – Visa requirements for Japanese citizens are waived.

October 
 20 October – Bahá’u’lláh's - Baha'i faith's founder's Bicentenary

Deaths

 16 February – Isahak Isahakyan, banker (b. 1933).
 21 August – Perch Zeytuntsyan, playwright and screenwriter, government minister (b. 1938).

References

 
Years of the 21st century in Armenia
Armenia
Armenia
Armenia
2010s in Armenia